Sitakund Degree College is a non-government degree college in Sitakunda, Chittagong District, Bangladesh, established in 1968. The college was founded by Mrs. Nirupoma Mukharji. The college stands on her own property.

See also 
 List of colleges in Chittagong

References 

Colleges in Chittagong
Private colleges in Bangladesh